Numen: International Review for the History of Religions is a bimonthly peer-reviewed academic journal covering the history of religions of any regions and times. It was established in 1954 and is published by Brill Publishers on behalf of the International Association for the History of Religions. The editors-in-chief are Laura Feldt (University of Southern Denmark), and Ülo Valk (University of Tartu).

Abstracting and indexing
The journal is abstracted and indexed in:

According to Scopus, it has a 2018 SCImago Journal Rank of 0.232, ranking in the first quartile of both the 'History' and 'Religious Studies' categories.

References

External links
 

Publications established in 1954
Religion history journals
English-language journals
Bimonthly journals
Brill Publishers academic journals